Bibi Maryam Bakhtiari (1874–1937) (Luri: بی مَریَمِ بَختیاری Bi Maryam Baxtiâri, Persian: بی بی مریم بختیاری) was the daughter of Hossein Gholi Khan Bakhtiari, the sister of Ali-Qoli Khan Bakhtiari and an Iranian Lor Bakhtiari revolutionary and  activist of the Iranian Constitutional Revolution.
As a military commander, she played a distinguished role when Bakhtiari  forces with help of modern arms from German Empire successfully captured Tehran in 1909 as part of the revolutionary campaign to force the central government to establish democratic reforms.

Life 
Bibi Maryam was an educated and enlightened Iranian woman in the twentieth century. She was one of the foremost women's rights activists and pioneers of freedom movements in the constitutional movement. Because of her nomadic life, Bibi Maryam was skilled in shooting techniques and craftsmanship.

The role in the constitutional revolution 
Bibi Maryam was one of the main proponents of Sardar Asad Bakhtiari, to conquer Tehran. Through several letters and telegraphs, and her exciting and effective lectures, she prepared tribal forces to fighting against the Minor tyranny (Mohammad Ali Shah tyranny). Before the liberation of Tehran by the Constitutionalist forces in 1909, she moved to Tehran accompanied with some Bakhtiary skilled warriors and stayed in her father's house for guerrilla planning. When Sardar Asa'd's forces reached Tehran, she and her husband's warriors joined the constitutionalist forces against the Mohammad Ali Shah's troops. She personally took the gun and fought against the cossacks alongside the Lurish warriors. Due to her bravity in the fight and the technical skills in disarming the ruling troops, her popularity increased so that she was given the honorary rank of sardar (high commander), and then she became famous as Sardar Bibi Maryam Bakhtiari.

See also 
 Ali-Qoli Khan Bakhtiari
 Qadam Kheyr

References

1874 births
1937 deaths
20th-century Iranian women politicians
People of the Persian Constitutional Revolution
Bakhtiari people
Lur people
Lur women
Burials at Takht-e Foulad
5- soltani.paricher(2010):sardar bi bi maryam bakhtiari sardar azadegi according to unpublishd documents . ildokht bakhtiari . tehran(564 pades)